Xinxiang County is a county in Xinxiang, Henan Province. It is situated in the center of the northern Henan Plateau. The Taihang Mountains are to the north, and the Yellow River is to the south. The postal code is 453700.

The county dates back to the Sui Dynasty (AD 581–618).

Administrative divisions
As 2012, this county is divided to 6 towns, 1 townships and 1 other.
Towns

Townships
Hehe Township

Others
Xinxiang Economic Development Zone

References

External links
Official website of Xinxiang County Government

County-level divisions of Henan
Xinxiang